Piskupshtina is a village in Municipality of Struga, North Macedonia.

Demographics
Piskupština (Peskoposhtina) appears in the Ottoman defter of 1467 as a village in the timar of Saadi Hoca in the vilayet of Dulgoberda. The settlement had a total of six households and the anthroponyms recorded attest to a mixed Albanian-Slavic character, although clear instances of Slavicisation are identifiable. For example, a certain Dobrosllav Zogovići is recorded among the village household heads, his patronym is derived from the Albanian zog ("bird") with the addition of the Slavic suffix -ovići. Household heads: Gjon Veselko; Miho Kostovo; Gjergj Kosta; Miho Rojko; Andrije, brother of Gjon Veselko; and Dobrosllav Zogovići.  

The register also notes that the lands of Piskupština were worked and planted by farmers from the neighbouring villages.  

According to the 2002 census, the village had a total of 182 inhabitants. Ethnic groups in the village include:

Macedonians 182

References

Villages in Struga Municipality